The Athena Film Festival is an annual film festival held at Barnard College of Columbia University in New York City. The festival takes place in February and focuses on films celebrating women and leadership. In addition to showing films, the festival hosts filmmaker workshops, master classes and panels on a variety of topics relevant to women in the film industry. The Athena Film Festival was co-founded by Kathryn Kolbert, Founding Director of the Athena Center for Leadership Studies at Barnard College and Melissa Silverstein, founder of the Women and Hollywood initiative and the festival's Artistic Director.

The tenth annual Athena Film Festival was held from February 27-March 1, 2020.

Awards
Each year, awards are granted to individuals who have made a significant impact in their industry over the course of their career. In 2012, The Laura Ziskin Lifetime Achievement Award was created in honor of the late Laura Ziskin, a noted producer and breast cancer advocate.

Winners

2011
Leslie Bennetts, contributing editor at Vanity Fair
Debra Martin Chase, producer
Abigail Disney, documentary filmmaker
Delia Ephron, screenwriter
Greta Gerwig, actress
Debra Granik, director
Tanya Hamilton, director
Chris Hegedus, documentary filmmaker
Gini Reticker, documentary filmmaker
Anne Rosellini, screenwriter and producer
Nancy Schreiber, cinematographer
Anne Thompson, writer
Debra Zimmerman, executive director of Women Make Movies

2012
Laura Ziskin, accepted by her daughter Julia Barry (Laura Ziskin Lifetime Achievement Award)
Nekisa Cooper, producer
The Fempire: Diablo Cody, Dana Fox, Liz Meriwether, and Lorene Scafaria
Rachael Horovitz, producer
Theresa Rebeck, author and playwright
Dee Rees, director
Julie Taymor, film and Broadway director

2013
Gale Anne Hurd, producer (Laura Ziskin Lifetime Achievement Award)
Ava DuVernay, director and distributor
Molly Haskell, film critic
Rose Kuo, (former) executive director of Film Society of Lincoln Center
Pat Mitchell, president of the Paley Center for Media

2014
Sherry Lansing, former studio executive and philanthropist (Laura Ziskin Lifetime Achievement Award)
Callie Khouri, director and screenwriter
Kasi Lemmons, director
Keri Putnam, executive director of the Sundance Institute

2015
Jodie Foster, actress and director (Laura Ziskin Lifetime Achievement Award)
Sheila Nevins, president of HBO Documentary Films
Gina Prince-Bythewood, director
Cathy Schulman, producer

2016
Mira Nair, Laura Ziskin Lifetime Achievement Award
Geralyn Dreyfous, Athena Award
Karyn Kusama, Athena Award
Jeanine Tesori, Athena Award
Paul Feig, Leading Man Award
Suffragette, Ensemble Award
Kate McKinnon, presenter

2017
Eve Ensler, playwright, activist, performer and author
Patricia Riggen, director
Regina K. Scully, producer
David Oyelowo, actor, leading man award

Athena List

In 2014, the festival announced the first edition of the Athena List, created to highlight finished, unproduced screenplays featuring roles with female leaders. The list is based on the concept of the popular Hollywood Black List, with a gender-conscious angle.

Selected scripts

2014

2015

2016
"A Noble Affair" by Anil Baral and Kathryn Maughan
"In the Land of Fire and Ice" by David MacGregor
"Ride the Wind" by Denise Meyers
"Virginia" by Bess Wohl

2017
"Claude" by Hannah Patterson
"Clemency" by Chinonye Chukwu
"Mrs. Christie" by Jamie Dawson
"Scott" by Anna Rose Moore

2018 

 True North by Katherine Ruppe
 Throw Like A Girl By Lori Bell Leahy
 Saving Esperanza by Betty Sullivan
 WHITE by A. Sayeeda Moreno

2019 

 Hedy by Giovanni Porta
 Out of My Mind by Daniel Stiepleman
 Roe v. Wade by Jennifer Majka
 The Defining Moment by Margaret Nagle

2020 

 Auto High by Nina Kentsis
 Good Chance [Formerly Mother-Daughter] by Tricia Lee
 Noor By Nijla Mu’min
 Over It by Joy Goodwin
 What the Eyes Don’t See by Cherien Dabis

2022 

 Sunflower: The Fannie Lou Hamer Story by Aunjanue Ellis
 The Gatekeeper by Jennifer Vanderbes
 Ray of Life by Kate Sheffield

External links
 Official website

References

Film festivals in New York City
Barnard College
Annual events in New York City